The men's 90 kg weightlifting competitions at the 1984 Summer Olympics in Los Angeles took place on 5 August at the Albert Gersten Pavilion. It was the ninth appearance of the middle heavyweight class.

Results

References

Weightlifting at the 1984 Summer Olympics